The Church of Saint Nicholas is a Late-Gothic and Baroque church in the Old Town of Prague. It was built between 1732-1737 on the site of a Gothic church from the 13th century which was also dedicated to Saint Nicholas.

The church was formerly used by the Czech and Slovak Orthodox Church. Since 1920 it has been the main church of the Czechoslovak Hussite Church and its Prague diocese.

During the Prague uprising in 1945, the church was used by the Czech partisans as a concealed site for Radio Prague, as the main radio building was under attack by the Waffen-SS.

Gallery

References

External links 

Prague Experience: St. Nicholas Church Old Town Square in Prague

Nicholas Church, Saint
Baroque church buildings in the Czech Republic
Gothic architecture in the Czech Republic
Kilian Ignaz Dientzenhofer buildings
National Cultural Monuments of the Czech Republic
Church buildings with domes
Churches completed in 1737
Old Town (Prague)
Czechoslovak Hussite Church
18th-century churches in the Czech Republic